Axel Bruns is a German-Australian media scholar. He is a Professor of Communication and Media Studies at QUT Digital Media Research Centre, Queensland University of Technology in Brisbane, Australia, and a Chief Investigator in the ARC Centre of Excellence for Automated Decision-Making and Society.

Bruns is the author of Blogs, Wikipedia, Second Life and Beyond: From Production to Produsage (2008) and Gatewatching: Collaborative Online News Production (2005).

In 1997, Bruns was a co-founder of the premier online academic publisher M/C (Media and Culture), which publishes M/C Journal and M/C Reviews, and he continues to serve as M/C'''s General Editor. In 2000, he co-founded dotlit: The Online Journal of Creative Writing''.

After a brief period studying physics in his native Germany, Bruns' research focus changed to Media and Cultural studies. He completed a PhD at the University of Queensland in 2002 that analysed the emerging Website genre of Resource Centre Sites such as indymedia and Slashdot. Bruns found that "Resource Centre Site produsers engage in an adaptation of both traditional journalistic gatekeeping methodologies and librarianly resource collection approaches to the Web environment: in the absence of gates to keep online, they have become 'gatewatchers', observing the publication of news and information in other sources and publicising its existence through their own sites."

His findings in this formulative thesis have spurred much of his further research into the online media field, including two of his key concepts, Produsage and Gatewatching.
Bruns is an expert on the impact of user-led content creation in the fields of produsers and produsage, blogging, gatewatching and citizen journalism and learning and teaching in the digital age. 'His current work focuses especially on the study of user participation in social media spaces such as Twitter in the context of acute events.'

Influences 
Bruns draws on the works of scholars from a number of different fields. Produsage has evolved out of Yochai Benkler's work in commons based peer-production, which Benkler has described as  "the emergence of a  new information environment, one in which individuals are free to take a  more active role than was possible in the industrial information economy of the twentieth century." Bruns offers the concept of produsers as re-development on Alvin Toffler's ideas of the prosumer, he believes Toffler's definition of the prosumer is "anything but the active, content‐creating, self-directed individual whom we may encounter in the produsage community…they merely consume commercial products rather than actively contributing their own ideas."

Bruns' development of gatewatching theory comes out of the work of Herbert Gans and his ideas on "multiperspectiviality". He believes that the plurality of media forms currently available may allow for the realization of a Gansian mediasphere. "It is possible to suggest, however, that the news, and the news media, be multiperspectival, presenting and representing as many perspectives as possible – and at the very least, more than today."

Bruns' contemporaries and influences in the fields of citizen journalism, produsage and gatewatching include: Henry Jenkins, Yochai Benkler, Clay Shirky, J.D. Lasica, Alfred Hermida. Jack Lule, Graham Meikle amongst a host of other new media and online media scholars.

Produsage 
Bruns' research into user-led content production, or produsage, investigates the "changed content production value chain model in collaborative online environments: in these environments, a strict producer/consumer dichotomy no longer applies – instead, users are almost always also able to be producers of content, and often necessarily so in the very act of using it."

He identifies four key characteristics of these online environments:
 	User Led Content Production
 	Collaborative Engagement
 	Palimpsestic, Iterative, Evolutionary Development
 	Alternative Approaches to Intellectual Property
 	Heterachichal, Permeable Community Structures

Gatewatching 
Bruns defines gatewatching practice as "observing the many gates through which a steady stream of information passes from these sources, and of highlighting from this stream that information which is of most relevance to one's own personal interests or to the interests of one's wider community."

It is distinct from its predecessor in gatekeeping, where the limited channels of mass communication mediums (print and broadcast) media necessitated "filtering" of all the news of the day, by selecting only the "news that's fit to print" (as the New York Times slogan famously puts it), according to internal selection policies and their own idealized (and often somewhat condescending) image of what "the man on the street" was interested in. Journalists, in other words, positioned themselves as keepers of the gates which controlled a steady flow of relevant news to their audiences.

In the current "multiperspectival" online media sphere "gatekeeping as a means of ensuring broad and balanced coverage, therefore, is no longer strictly necessary; the gates have multiplied beyond all control".

Bruns argues that in the online gatewatching environment, agency has shifted from the journalistic profession to anyone interested in getting involved through citizen journalism or "random acts of journalism" on sites such as Twitter. Gatewatching merely compiles one or a number of related reports on a newsworthy event, thereby publicising the event and the stories, which cover it, rather than publishing a news report. Additionally, gatewatching much like its theoretical partner, produsage, engages with user led content production collaborative engagement palimpsestic, iterative, evolutionary development and heterachichal, permeable community structures.

The development of produsage in tandem with gatewatching practices is fundamentally changing the way we view and consume news argues Bruns. He maintains that traditional media forms can no longer rely on their control of distribution mechanisms and must engage participatory media in order to remain relevant. Further, he argues that the "'Us v.s. Them' dichotomy of citizen journalism v.s. industrial journalis" needs to be abandoned in order to produce a Gansian multiperspectival media environment. As Herbert Gans once suggested, "the news may be too important to leave to the journalists alone (1980, p. 22) – and in social media environments where news is ambient, shared, fluid, and circulating, it no longer is".

Bibliography 
 Axel Bruns. Gatewatching and news curation: Journalism, social media, and the public sphere. New York: Peter Lang, 2018.
 Katrin Weller, Axel Bruns, Jean Burgess, Merja Mahrt, and Cornelius Puschmann, eds. Twitter and Society. New York: Peter Lang, 2014. 
 John Hartley, Jean Burgess, and Axel Bruns, eds. A Companion to New Media Dynamics. London: Blackwell, 2013.
 Axel Bruns. Blogs, Wikipedia, Second Life and Beyond: From Production to Produsage. New York: Peter Lang, 2008.
 Axel Bruns and Joanne Jacobs, eds. Uses of Blogs. New York: Peter Lang, 2006.
 Axel Bruns. Gatewatching: Collaborative Online News Production. New York: Peter Lang, 2005.

References 

Academic staff of Queensland University of Technology
Living people
Year of birth missing (living people)
Place of birth missing (living people)
Australian mass media scholars
German mass media scholars
German emigrants to Australia